The 2013 EMF miniEuro was the fourth edition of the EMF miniEURO for national Small-sided football teams. It was hosted in Rethymno, Greece, from 10 to 13 October 2013.

The final tournament was contested by 24 teams. The matches were played in one venue in the city of Rethymno, at an especially built stadium.

The defending champions, Romania, kept their title by overcoming Croatia 2–0 in the final.

Group stage
In the group stage, the 24 teams were divided into 6 groups of 4 teams, with each team playing 3 matches. the teams finishing in the top two positions in each of the six groups progressed to the knockout stage, along with the best four third-placed teams.

Group A

Group B

Group C

Group D

Group E

Group F

Ranking of third-placed teams

Knockout stage
The knockout stage matches were played on 12–13 October 2013. If a match is drawn after 40 minutes of regular play, a penalty shoot-out is used to determine the winner.

Bracket

References

External links
 Official EMF website

2013
International association football competitions hosted by Greece
2013 in European sport
2013 in Greek sport
Sport in Crete